Bridgend of Lintrathen is a village in Angus, Scotland. It is situated on the southern shore of Loch of Lintrathen, six miles west of Kirriemuir.

References

Villages in Angus, Scotland